Plainfield High School (abbreviated PHS) in Plainfield, Indiana, United States. It is a public high school located within the Plainfield Community School Corporation.

History

In March 2008, the school hosted then-democratic candidate for president Barack Obama as he spoke during his run for presidency.

Athletics
Plainfield is a part of the Mid State Conference.  They compete under the name "Quakers" (or Lady Quakers) and the school colors are scarlet and royal blue.  The following IHSAA  sports are offered at Plainfield (Unless marked there are separate boys and girls teams):

Baseball (boys)
Basketball
Boys state 3A champion - 1999
Cross country
Football (boys)
Golf
Soccer
Softball (girls)
State 4A champion - 2012
Swimming
Tennis
Track
Boys state champion - 2022
Volleyball (girls)
Wrestling (boys)

Notable alumni
Dee Bell - jazz singer
Edd Cantrell - former police officer
Del Harris - current Vice-President of Texas Legends of NBA Development League; former head coach of NBA's Houston Rockets, Milwaukee Bucks and Los Angeles Lakers; assistant coach for various NBA teams, including Rockets, Bucks, Dallas Mavericks, Chicago Bulls and New Jersey Nets.
James Hurst - current NFL offensive tackle for New Orleans Saints
Jason Pociask - former NFL fullback and tight end for New York Jets, New England Patriots, Tampa Bay Buccaneers, Indianapolis Colts, Carolina Panthers, Seattle Seahawks and Dallas Cowboys; played one season for Florida Tuskers of UFL.
Haris Suleman, Pakistani-American aviator who died while attempting to circumnavigate the world as the youngest pilot in history.

See also
 List of high schools in Indiana

References

External links

School district

Public high schools in Indiana
Schools in Hendricks County, Indiana
Educational institutions established in 1897
1897 establishments in Indiana